Namsan (남산, 南山, "South Mountain") is a 148-metre peak in Eunyul-gun, South Hwanghae Province, North Korea.

Mountains of North Korea